Johanna Elizabeth Teunissen-Waalboer (25 May 1919 – 3 April 1991) was a Dutch javelin thrower. She competed at the 1948 Summer Olympics and finished in fifth place.

References

1919 births
1991 deaths
Athletes (track and field) at the 1948 Summer Olympics
Dutch female javelin throwers
Olympic athletes of the Netherlands
People from Rheden
Sportspeople from Gelderland